Life Goes On (Swedish: Livet går vidare) is a 1941 Swedish drama film directed by Anders Henrikson and starring Edvin Adolphson, Aino Taube and Sigurd Wallén. It was shot at the Centrumateljéerna Studios in Stockholm. The film's sets were designed by the art director Arthur Spjuth.

Synopsis
After years of service with the French Army in Africa, a Swedish officer returns home to recover from a bout of malaria.

Cast
 Edvin Adolphson as Mikael Bourg 
 Aino Taube as Ebba Garland 
 Sigurd Wallén as Dr. Bolivar Garland 
 Hasse Ekman as Ludvig 
 Anders Henrikson as Andersson 
 Margit Andelius as Woman at the Library
 Blenda Bruno as Nurse 
 Åke Claesson as Librarian 
 Nils Dahlgren as Doctor 
 Carl Deurell as Man at the Library 
 Ragnar Falck as Bengtsson, Worker
 Hartwig Fock as Carrier 
 Anna-Lisa Fröberg as Woman 
 Sten Hedlund as A Man 
 Agda Helin as Wife 
 Kaj Hjelm as Boy at the Library 
 Hjördis Jansson as Nurse 
 Stig Järrel as Kristensson 
 Sten Lindgren as Dr. Holmström 
 Sven-Bertil Norberg as French Officer 
 Aurore Palmgren as Mrs. Johansson 
 Olav Riégo as Sandgren 
 Eva Stiberg as A Girl
 Ulla Wallin as Nurse 
 Ragnar Widestedt as Banker

References

Bibliography 
 Per Olov Qvist & Peter von Bagh. Guide to the Cinema of Sweden and Finland. Greenwood Publishing Group, 2000.

External links 
 

1941 films
1941 drama films
Swedish drama films
1940s Swedish-language films
Films directed by Anders Henrikson
Films scored by Lars-Erik Larsson
1940s Swedish films